The ITU vegetation model is a radio propagation model that estimates the path loss encountered due to the presence of one or more trees inside a point to point telecommunication link. The predictions found from this model is congruent to those found from Weissberger’s modified exponential decay model in low frequencies.

History

The CCIR, predecessor of ITU, adopted this model in the late 1986.

Applicable to/under conditions

 This model is applicable on the situations where the telecommunication link has some obstructions made by trees along its way
 This model is suitable for point-to-point microwave links that has a vegetation in their path.
 Typical application of this model is to predict the path loss for microwave links.

Coverage

Frequency: Not specified

Depth of Foliage: Not specified

Mathematical formulation

The model is formulated as:

Where

L = The path loss. Unit: decibel (dB)
f = The frequency of transmission. Unit: megahertz (MHz)
d = The depth of foliage along the link: Unit: meter (m)

Points to note

This equation is scaled for frequency specified in megahertz (MHz).

The depth of foliage must be in the units of meters.

Limitations

The results of this model gets impractical at high frequencies.

See also

Radio propagation model

Further reading

Introduction to RF Propagation, John S. Seybold, 2005, John Wiley and Sons.

Radio frequency propagation model